Roland Craig Symonette (born 21 August 1951) is a sailor from The Bahamas. Symonetten represented his country at the 1972 Summer Olympics in Kiel. Symonette took 25th place in the Soling with his half brother Bobby Symonette as helmsman and Percy Knowles as fellow crew member.

References

Living people
1951 births
Bahamian male sailors (sport)
Sailors at the 1972 Summer Olympics – Soling
Olympic sailors of the Bahamas
Bahamian people of English descent